Parischnolea is a genus of longhorn beetles of the subfamily Lamiinae, containing the following species:

 Parischnolea excavata Breuning, 1942
 Parischnolea jatai Martins & Galileo, 1995

References

Desmiphorini